Canary Wharf Group plc is a British property company headquartered in London, England. Over the last 10 years it has constructed more office space in London than any other developer. The group owns  of property which is worth £4.9 billion, of which 95.6% was let as of 30 June 2012.

History
The company was formed in 1993 as Canary Wharf Limited to acquire the former assets of Olympia and York from its administrator.

In December 1995, the company was acquired by an international consortium, including Olympia and York founder Paul Reichmann.

In April 1999, the company floated on the London Stock Exchange.

In 2004, a majority of the company was acquired by Glick Family Investments and Morgan Stanley using an investment vehicle company called Songbird Acquisitions, which was later taken over by China Investment Corporation.

In 2015, Brookfield Properties and Qatar Investment Authority took over Canary Wharf Group for £2.6 billion. Songbird was delisted following the takeover.

Structure
The group owns Canary Wharf Contractors, a business which has built most of the buildings at Canary Wharf. The Canary Wharf Group has also launched Vertus, a build-to-rent arm with properties under development in Canary Wharf.

Relationship with Transport for London
Several large transport projects have been constructed which link to Canary Wharf, including the Jubilee Line Extension and Crossrail.

The Canary Wharf Group agreed to pay £500m over 24 years towards the £3.5bn cost of the Jubilee Line extension. The payment was reduced by at least £25m because the line was unable to run at the capacity agreed. Canary Wharf Group built the Canary Wharf railway station for Crossrail at a cost of around £500m, contributing £150m towards the station cost.

The links between Canary Wharf Group and Transport for London remain strong, with Canary Wharf's Finance Director Peter Anderson previously on the board of Transport for London and chairing its finance and policy committee.

The Canary Wharf Group has consistently campaigned against the now defunct Cycle Superhighway routes. In 2014, the Group opposed two cycle routes dubbed "Crossrail for bikes" by anonymously distributed a briefing paper claiming the project would be "extremely damaging to London". In 2018, Canary Wharf Group were a founding member of Unblock the Embankment, a campaign to remove segregated cycle route along the Embankment.

Property portfolio

Notable property addresses are:

Outside Canary Wharf itself, CWG also developed 20 Fenchurch Street and is redeveloping the Shell Centre site in central London.

See also 
 Paul Reichmann

References

External links
 Canary Wharf Group website
 Canary Wharf - Official Information Site

Property companies based in London
Real estate companies established in 1993
1993 establishments in England
Canary Wharf
Reichmann family